Fazlollah Javidnia is an Iranian retired fighter pilot and a Grumman F-14 Tomcat flying ace during the Iran–Iraq War.

Career 
During the war, he established reputation as a courageous and patriotic pilot within the Islamic Republic of Iran Air Force. 
In 2015, French military historian Pierre Razoux credited him with 12 aerial victories, naming him above Jalil Zandi and Fereidoun Ali-Mazandarani as the most successful pilot of the war. In 2019, he wrote that Javidnia has 11 confirmed kills in addition to 2 probable victories.

After the war, he continued his career successfully and reached the rank of brigadier general. He was retired in 2002 at the age of 51 and started to trade Persian carpets as his family business for some time. Javidnia later ceased business activities due to health issues and became involved in military research with an aim to promote a scientific approach towards the Iran–Iraq War.

Bibliography 
A Battle in the Sky (2013): memoirs of Javidnia, written by Mohamma Moamma and published by Ketab Yusef and Emad Institute in Persian language

See also 

 List of Iranian flying aces

References 

Iran–Iraq War flying aces
Iranian flying aces
Living people
Islamic Republic of Iran Army brigadier generals
Recipients of the Order of Fath
Military personnel from Isfahan
Year of birth missing (living people)
Islamic Republic of Iran Air Force personnel
Iranian military personnel of the Iran–Iraq War